Carlos Camilo Góes Capiberibe (born 23 May 1972) is a Brazilian politician. He was the Governor of the Brazilian state of Amapá from 2011 to 2015

Personal life
Capiberibe is the son of zoologist João Capiberibe and teacher Janete Capiberibe. He is an alumnus of the Pontifical Catholic University of Campinas, and has a master's degree from Université de Montréal. Both his parents have ties to politics, with his mother also serving as federal deputy and his father being the past governor of Amapá.

His parents were involved in the socialist movement before his birth but fled to Chile after the 1964 Brazilian coup d'état, where Carlos and his twin sister Luciana was born. He also has a younger sister named Artionka who is an anthropologist. With the 1973 Chilean coup d'état and overthrow of Salvador Allende by Augusto Pinochet, his family fled again this time to Canada.

In his youth Capiberibe was part of several university student political groups, including the Aliança Nacional Libertadora (ANL) or  National Liberating Alliance. After graduating from university he became the secretary of organization of the state executive of the Brazilian Socialist Party.

Political career
In 2006 he was elected to the state legislature of Amapá with 5,213.

In 2010 Capiberibe ran for governor in the state of Amapá. In the first round he received 28% of the vote. In the second round, on 31 October 2010 he won more than 170,000 votes, the largest vote in state history for a gubernatorial candidate, and with 53.77% of the vote became governor.

In the 2018 Brazilian general election Capiberibe announced that he was running for the national chamber of federal deputies.

References

Governors of Amapá
Living people
1972 births
People from Santiago
Brazilian twins
Université de Montréal alumni
Brazilian Socialist Party politicians
Members of the Chamber of Deputies (Brazil) from Amapá
Members of the Legislative Assembly of Amapá